The 2009–10 Supersport Series was a first-class cricket competition held in South Africa from 17 September 2009 to 28 March 2010. Cape Cobras won the tournament for the first time, winning six of the ten matches and drawing three. On the opening day of the final round of matches, Eagles batsman Rilee Rossouw scored the fastest triple century in South African domestic cricket, reaching the mark in just 276 deliveries against the Titans.

Points table

References

External links
 Series home at ESPN Cricinfo

South African domestic cricket competitions
Supersport Series
2009–10 South African cricket season
Sunfoil Series